Andrzej Szlachta (born 19 January 1947) is a Polish politician. He was elected to the Sejm on 25 September 2005, getting 13,824 votes in 23 Rzeszów district as a candidate from the Law and Justice list.

See also
Members of Polish Sejm 2005-2007

External links
Andrzej Szlachta - parliamentary page - includes declarations of interest, voting record, and transcripts of speeches.

1947 births
Living people
People from Rzeszów
Members of the Polish Sejm 2005–2007
Law and Justice politicians
Members of the Polish Sejm 2007–2011
Members of the Polish Sejm 2011–2015